Xuedytes bellus is a species of beetle found in Du'an, Guangxi Province, China and, the only known species in the genus Xuedytes. This species may be "the most extremely cave-adapted trechine" beetle in the world, morphologically adapted to life in the darkness of the caves of southern China. It lacks flight wings, eyes, and pigmentation. Its physical characteristics most resemble the beetle genera Giraffahaenops and Dongodytes. Like Giraffahaenops, Xuedytes bellus has a thin and elongated body. However, its elytra are similar to those of Dongodytes. The genus Xuedytes differs from both of the aforementioned genera in its prothorax, which is longer than its head, its narrow elytra, and the right mandibular tooth shows an evolutionary adaptation. Xuedytes are generally 8.3–9.0 mm in length when measured from the apex of the right mandible to the elytral apex and 1.4–1.5 mm in width. It is characterized as having a yellowish brown body, with tarsi, palps, and antennae pale, and a strongly shining head.

References

Trechinae
Monotypic Carabidae genera
Endemic fauna of China
Insects of China
Beetles described in 2017